Bloomington is a hamlet in Ulster County, New York, United States. Bloomington has a post office with ZIP code 12411, which opened on July 20, 1897.

References

Hamlets in Ulster County, New York
Hamlets in New York (state)